Antonio Javellana Ledesma,  (born March 28, 1943) is a Filipino Roman Catholic clergyman who served as the Archbishop of the Metropolitan Archdiocese of Cagayan de Oro in the Philippines from 2006 to 2020.

Early life

Born on March 28, 1943, in Iloilo City, Philippines. He spent his elementary years at St. Aloysius School and later at the Ateneo de Manila. Since then, he remained with the Ateneo until he finished his degree in history and government, graduating magna cum laude in 1963.

He studied philosophy and theology at the Loyola House of Studies from 1966 to 1968 and from 1970 to 1973, respectively. He attained his master's degree in political science from the University of the Philippines. He attended the University of Wisconsin–Madison in the United States, completing his doctorate in development in 1980.

Ministry

Priesthood

On May 30, 1963, Ledesma entered the Society of Jesus. He was ordained priest on April 16, 1973.

He served as an assistant parish priest in Siay, Zamboanga Sibugay, from 1980 to 1981. From 1982 to 1996, he worked as a professor and was assigned to various positions in Xavier University. He taught sociology, economics, and religious studies.

During the same period, he sat as chairman of different societies and non-governmental organizations.

Episcopate

Pope John Paul II appointed Ledesma as Coadjutor Prelate of Ipil on June 13, 1996. He succeeded Federico O. Escaler as the Prelate of Ipil on June 28, 1997.

On March 4, 2006, he was appointed by Pope Benedict XVI as Archbishop of Cagayan de Oro. During his term, he has led the Catholic Bishops' Conference of the Philippines as Chairman of the Episcopal Commission on Inter-religious Dialogue since 2009. He has convened local religious leaders in inter-religious dialogues on different social issues. In the aftermath of Typhoon Sendong and in the absence of local government leadership, he led the multi-sectoral relief effort to address the needs of calamity victims.

During the 2016 Philippine Presidential Elections, he wrote a pastoral letter calling out presidential candidate Rodrigo Duterte for his inaction on the rising number of extrajudicial killings in Davao City where the latter was mayor. One month into the presidency of eventual winner Duterte, Ledesma made a call to stop extrajudicial killings. He said:

Ledesma has also supported efforts to resolve Mindanao's protracted struggle with Muslim separatists. He has spoken and advocated for the Bangsamoro Basic Law.

On June 23, 2020, Pope Francis accepted his retirement as Archbishop of Cagayan de Oro and was succeeded by then-Malaybalay Bishop Jose Cabantan.

See also
 Roman Catholic Church
 Society of Jesus
 Roman Catholic Archdiocese of Cagayan de Oro
 Roman Catholic Diocese of Ipil
 Southeast Asia Rural Social Leadership Institute

References

21st-century Roman Catholic archbishops in the Philippines
1943 births
Living people
Roman Catholic archbishops of Cagayan de Oro
People from Iloilo City
20th-century Filipino Jesuits
Jesuit archbishops
Ateneo de Manila University alumni
University of the Philippines alumni
University of Wisconsin–Madison alumni
Visayan people
Filipino archbishops